Lutsi may refer to:

 Lutsi, Estonian name of Ludza, a city in Latvia
 Lutsi Estonians, a historic ethnic group in Latvia
 Lutsi dialect, South Estonian dialect of Latvia

See also 
 Luzi